Gamete donation is the donation of gametes, either ova or sperm, and may thus refer to:

Egg donation
Sperm donation

Medical donations
Giving